The 2014 Boston Pizza Cup, the provincial men's curling championship for Alberta, was held from February 5 to 9 at the Lacombe Curling Club in Lacombe, Alberta. The winner represented Alberta at the 2014 Tim Hortons Brier in Kamloops.

Qualification process
Twelve teams qualified for the provincial tournament through several methods. The qualification process is as follows:

Teams

Knockout Draw Brackets

A Event

B Event

C Event

Results
All draws are listed in Mountain Standard Time (UTC−7).

Draw 1
Wednesday, February 5, 9:30 am

Draw 2
Wednesday, February 5, 6:30 pm

Draw 3
Thursday, February 6, 9:00 am

Draw 4
Thursday, February 6, 2:00 pm

Draw 5
Thursday, February 6, 6:30 pm

Draw 6
Friday, February 7, 9:00 am

Draw 7
Friday, February 7, 2:00 pm

Draw 8
Friday, February 7, 6:30 pm

Draw 9
Saturday, February 8, 1:00 pm

Playoffs

A vs. B
Saturday, February 8, 6:30 pm

C1 vs. C2
Saturday, February 8, 6:30 pm

Semifinal
Sunday, February 9, 9:00 am

Final
Sunday, February 9, 2:00 pm

References

External links

Curling in Alberta
Boston Pizza Cup
Boston Pizza Cup
Lacombe, Alberta
2014 in Alberta